The 2013–14 All-Ireland Junior Club Hurling Championship was the 11th staging of the All-Ireland Junior Club Hurling Championship since its establishment by the Gaelic Athletic Association. The championship ran from 29 September 2013 to 15 February 2014.

The All-Ireland final was played on 15 February 2014 at Cusack Park in Mullingar, between Creggan Kickhams from Antrim and Ballysaggart from Waterford, in what was their first ever meeting in the final. Creggan Kickhams won the match, after a replay, by 1-11 to 1-07 to claim their first ever championship title.

Ballysaggart's Stephen Bennett was the championship's top scorer with 7-39.

Connacht Junior Club Hurling Championship

Connacht semi-final

Connacht final

Leinster Junior Club Hurling Championship

Leinster first round

Leinster quarter-finals

Leinster semi-finals

Leinster final

Munster Junior Club Hurling Championship

Munster quarter-final

Munster semi-finals

Munster final

Ulster Junior Club Hurling Championship

Ulster preliminary round

Ulster quarter-finals

Ulster semi-finals

Ulster final

All-Ireland Junior Club Hurling Championship

All-Ireland quarter-final

All-Ireland semi-finals

All-Ireland final

Championship statistics

Miscellaneous

 Following their All-Ireland final replay defeat, Ballysaggart lodged on objection claiming that Creggan Kickhams fielded an illegal player. Ballysaggart believed that Conor Small shouldn’t have played in either final game or in the Creggan Kickhams semi-final win over Fullen Gaels as he was underage. According to rule 6.16, a player must be over 16 years to play an adult game. It also states to be “over” 16 the player’s 16th birthday must fall prior to January 1 of the championship year. The Central Competitions Control Committee (CCCC) subsequently rejected Ballysaggart's appeal, however, no explanation was given.

References

All-Ireland Junior Club Hurling Championship
All-Ireland Junior Club Hurling Championship
All-Ireland Junior Club Hurling Championship